(William) Roger Hughes was a Welsh Anglican priest, most notably  Archdeacon of Carmarthen from 2012 to 2017.

References

 

Archdeacons of Carmarthen
20th-century Welsh Anglican priests
21st-century Welsh Anglican priests